Elections for Oxford City Council were held on Thursday 1 May 2008. As Oxford City Council is elected by halves, one seat in each of the 24 wards is up for election.

Overall turnout was 32.6%, down from 35.8% in 2006. The lowest turnout (20.8%) was in St Mary's ward and the highest (46.1%) in Marston.

Results 

Note: three Independents stood in 2008, compared with two in 2006.

This result has the following consequences for the total number of seats on the Council after the elections:

Results by ward

Barton and Sandhills

Blackbird Leys

Carfax 

Note that Paul Sargent won the Carfax seat in the 2004 elections for the Liberal Democrats, but crossed the floor to the Conservatives in 2007. So when comparing to the 2004 elections, the Liberal Democrats hold.

Churchill

Cowley

Cowley Marsh 

Note that Saj Malik won the Cowley Marsh seat in the 2004 elections for the Liberal Democrats, but crossed the floor to Labour in 2007. So when comparing to the 2004 elections, Labour gain from the Liberal Democrats.

Headington

Headington Hill and Northway

Hinksey Park 

Note: ±% figures are calculated with respect to the results of the by-election of 27 July 2006.

Holywell

Iffley Fields

Jericho and Osney

Littlemore

Lye Valley 

Note: ±% figures are calculated with respect to the results of the by-election of 21 September 2006.

Marston

North

Northfield Brook

Quarry and Risinghurst 

Note that Tia MacGregor won the Quarry and Risinghurst seat in the 2004 elections for the Liberal Democrats, but crossed the floor to the Conservatives in 2007. So when comparing to the 2004 elections, Labour gain from the Liberal Democrats.

Rose Hill and Iffley

St Clement's

St Margaret's

St Mary's

Summertown

Wolvercote

Party Share of Vote Map

Sources
Election results, from Oxford City Council

See also
Elections in the United Kingdom

2008
2008 English local elections
2000s in Oxford